Indio (Spanish for "Indian") is a city in Riverside County, California, United States, in the Coachella Valley of Southern California's Colorado Desert region.

The population was 89,137 in the 2020 United States Census, up from 76,036 at the 2010 census, an increase of 17%. Indio is the most populous city in the Coachella Valley, and was formerly referred to as the Hub of the Valley after a Chamber of Commerce slogan used in the 1970s. It was later nicknamed the City of Festivals, a reference to the numerous cultural events held in the city, most notably the Coachella Valley Music and Arts Festival.

Indio is the principal city of an urban area defined by the United States Census Bureau that is located in the Coachella Valley: the Indio–Palm Desert–Palm Springs CA urban area had a population of 361,075 as of the 2020 census, making it the 114th largest in the United States.

History
Indio was originally inhabited by the Desert Cahuilla Indians.

Railroad line construction east out of Los Angeles began in 1873. Trains were operated to Colton on July 16, 1875, and to Indio (then Indian Wells) on May 29, 1876. Moving on eastward from Indio, the railroad reached the west bank of the Colorado River opposite Yuma on May 23, 1877 (a village known as Arizona City prior to 1873). There was a delay in getting military authority to lay tracks across the Yuma Indian reservation, and it was September that year before the bridge was completed so trains could operate into Yuma. The Southern Pacific Railroad was to have joined those of the Texas & Pacific, one of several railroads then holding, or seeking, federal authority to build lines from various sections of the country west to the Pacific Coast. But the rail-head of the T & P was at a standstill far off in Texas, so Southern Pacific continued building eastward.

The City of Indio came about because of the need for a halfway point for the Southern Pacific Railroad between Yuma, Arizona and Los Angeles, since the engines needed to be refilled with water. At first, the would-be city was called Indian Wells, but since many other areas already had that name, Indio (after a Spanish variation of the word "Indian") was chosen instead. After the railroad's arrival in 1876, Indio really started to grow. The first permanent building was the craftsman-style Southern Pacific Depot station and hotel. Southern Pacific tried to make life as comfortable as it could for their workers to keep them from leaving such a difficult area to live in at the time. It was at the center of all social life in the desert with a fancy dining room and hosting dances on Friday nights.

While Indio started as a railroad town, it soon became agricultural. Onions, cotton, grapes, citrus and dates thrived in the arid climate due to the ingenuity of farmers finding various means of attaining water, first through artesian wells and later through the valley's branch of the All-American Canal. However, water also was a major problem for Indio and the city was flooded several times until the storm water canals were created throughout the Coachella Valley.

Businessmen and women found this last frontier land of the continental United States as an ideal place to start fresh. Dr. Harry Smiley and his wife Nell were early residents and stayed in Indio after their car broke down on the way to Los Angeles and became people of influence and helped shape the area. A. G. Tingman was an early store owner and first Postmaster of Indio, but also well known for taking advantage of miners as they headed to the mountains, selling at rather high prices. Later Dr. June Robertson McCarroll became a leading philanthropist and successful doctor in Indio. She was responsible along with the Indio Woman's Club for pressuring California into adopting the placing of white lines down the streets after she was nearly hit one too many times by passing vehicles. Even though these early founders of the city are considered pioneers, they still partook in the lifestyles of their friends living in such areas as Los Angeles. Indio established itself quickly and kept up with the trends as they were brought in by the railroads.

By the turn of the 20th century, Indio was already more than a fading railroad town. Schools were built, the La Casita hospital provided medical services, and families established roots. By 1920, about one to two thousand year-round residents lived in Indio, while it ballooned from 2,500 to 5,000 during the winter months and was advertised as a health resort for senior citizens and those with respiratory diseases and ailments in the rest of the 20th century.

Indio also served as the home of the USDA's Date Station, a place where leading scientific research was taking place on the fruit that would become a major part of the culture of Indio. The station started in 1907 and was responsible for the ability of local farmers to better understand this unique crop and make the Coachella Valley a leader in American date crops. This also created a tie to the Middle East that led to the theme for the County Fair with the Middle Eastern flair known as the Riverside County Fair and National Date Festival .

Coachella and Thermal soon became larger cities than Indio, but Indio remained the "Hub of the Valley", as it was called. With the burning of the majority of Thermal and the decline of Coachella, Indio grew again. By 1930, Indio was a thriving area and incorporated. On September 6, 1930, storekeeper Fred Kohler received the first business license in Indio.

Indio was also aided by the visiting soldiers from Patton's training grounds in Chiriaco Summit located 30 miles to the east.

In the second half of the 20th century, Indio saw another decline as the valley's population begin to move west towards newer cities such as Palm Desert.  However, there is now a reversal in this trend.

Geography

Indio is located at  (33.719871, −116.231889).

The telephone area code is 760. The city's ZIP codes are 92201 and 92203 north of Interstate 10.

Indio is home of Riverside County's eastern administration offices. Palm Springs had more people from 1955 to 1992, when the US census announced that Indio surpassed Palm Springs and that title was returned to them.

Climate
The climate of the Coachella Valley is influenced by the surrounding geography. High mountain ranges on three sides contribute to its unique and year-round warm climate, with some of warmest winters west of the Rocky Mountains. Monsoon related thunderstorms can occur in the summer months. In September 1939, a thunderstorm from the remains of a tropical storm, brought more than 6" of rain in less than 24 hours. Under  of annual precipitation are average, with over 348 days of sunshine per year.

Nature and wildlife 
Indio is in the Colorado Desert region of the Sonoran Desert. It is adjacent to the geologic Salton Sink and within the site of historic Lake Cahuilla of the Lower Colorado River Valley. Indio is an official National Bird Sanctuary, because of the seasonal bird migration flight routes that cross the town en route to the Salton Sea.
 Geography of the Colorado Desert
 Fauna of the Colorado Desert
 Sonoran Desert wildflowers

Demographics

2010
The 2010 United States Census reported that Indio had a population of 76,036. The racial makeup of Indio was 46,735 (61.5%) White (27.0% Non-Hispanic White), 1,805 (2.4%) African American, 741 (1.0%) Native American, 1,693 (2.2%) Asian, 55 (0.1%) Pacific Islander, 22,394 (29.5%) from other races, and 2,613 (3.4%) from two or more races. Hispanic or Latino of any race were 51,540 persons (67.8%).

There were 23,378 households, out of which 10,522 (45.0%) had children under the age of 18 living in them, 13,149 (56.2%) were opposite-sex married couples living together, 3,578 (15.3%) had a female householder with no husband present, 1,512 (6.5%) had a male householder with no wife present.  There were 1,654 (7.1%) unmarried opposite-sex partnerships, and 232 (1.0%) same-sex married couples or partnerships; 3,859 households (16.5%) were made up of individuals, and 1,777 (7.6%) had someone living alone who was 65 years of age or older. The average household size was 3.21. There were 18,239 families (78.0% of all households); the average family size was 3.60.

The population was spread out, with 22,879 people (30.1%) under the age of 18, 7,247 people (9.5%) aged 18 to 24, 20,705 people (27.2%) aged 25 to 44, 15,793 people (20.8%) aged 45 to 64, and 9,412 people (12.4%) who were 65 years of age or older. The median age was 32.2 years. For every 100 females, there were 97.3 males. For every 100 females age 18 and over, there were 94.5 males.

The homeowner vacancy rate was 5.0%; the rental vacancy rate was 12.5%, while 46,780 people (61.5% of the population) lived in owner-occupied housing units and 28,307 people (37.2%) lived in rental housing units.

During 2009–2013, Indio had a median household income of $50,068, with 21.9% of the population living below the federal poverty line.

2000
As of the census of 2000, there were 49,116 people, 13,871 households, and 11,069 families residing in the city. The racial makeup of the city was 44.4% White, 2.8% Black, 1.0% Native American, 1.5% Asian American, 0.1% Pacific Islander, 42.0% from other races, and 3.9% from two or more races.  65.7% of the population were Hispanic or Latino of any race.

There were 13,871 households, out of which 48.2% had children under the age of 18 living with them, 55.9% were married couples living together, 16.7% had a female householder with no husband present, and 20.2% were non-families. Of all households 16.0% were made up of individuals, and 7.0% had someone living alone who was 65 years of age or older.  The average household size was 3.5 and the average family size was 3.9.

In the city, the population was spread out, with 35.3% under the age of 18, 11.1% from 18 to 24, 29.4% from 25 to 44, 15.2% from 45 to 64, and 9.1% who were 65 years of age or older.  The median age was 27 years. For every 100 females, there were 101.2 males.  For every 100 females age 18 and over, there were 98.8 males.

The median income for a household in the city was $34,624, and the median income for a family was $35,564. Males had a median income of $25,651 versus $21,093 for females. The per capita income for the city was $13,525. About 16.8% of families and 21.5% of the population were below the poverty line, including 28.2% of those under age 18 and 12.0% of those age 65 or over.

Population growth
From 1984 to 2008, Indio grew many times its previous size. Indio handles unprecedented growth for being a select area of choice for thousands of new residents per year. In 2018, Indio was ranked the 30th fastest-growing city in America and 8th fastest-growing city in California.

The 2010 United States Census recorded the city's population to be about 76,000 residents, but it did not include the addition of seasonal residents. According to the Demographic Research Unit (DRU) of the California Department of Finance, the provisional population estimate for the City of Indio as of January 1, 2019, was 89,406.

Economy
Two major contributions to the local economy are year-round agriculture and tourism, although the majority of tourist activity is seasonal, between October and May.

Agriculture

Indio has been one of Southern California's most important agricultural regions, once responsible for a large percentage of the nation's date crop; however, due to increasing residential and recreational development, the date groves are now more limited to the south and southeast of Indio. Even the grove of date palm trees at the Riverside County Fair and national Date Festival grounds have been removed by the county.

One can visit Shields Date Gardens, a date grower that maintains a large retail store along State Highway 111. There are citrus groves and vegetable fields surrounding the city limits, but rapid development of new housing tracts and golf courses in the "East Valley" in the 1990s and 2000s has displaced most of the agricultural space.

Employment and job growth

Indio has increasingly served as a magnet of job opportunities for immigrants and newcomers from parts of California and across the nation. Jobs in fields such as agriculture, construction, hospitality, maintenance, and retail and housekeeping are highly sought after in the area.

Construction and government are among the largest employment sectors in Indio, with a higher proportion of workers in these industries in Indio than the rest of the Coachella Valley.

In addition to construction and government, a 2019 study revealed that the top five employment industries in Indio are educational services, entertainment services, wholesale/retail, agriculture/mining/construction, and waste services. Between 2007 and 2015, the percentage of retail trade jobs in Indio increased by 4.4 percent and the percentage of education jobs increased from 15.2 to 20.5 percent.

As the secondary seat of government for Riverside County, California, Indio has many county offices and employs more than a thousand county employees. The California Superior Court's Larson Justice Center, Riverside County's Law Library and District Attorney's office, numerous law firms along Highway 111, and the California Desert Trial Academy (CDTA) College of Law (the only law school in Riverside County), located at 45290 Fargo Street, have made Downtown Indio the center for law and legal studies in the Coachella Valley.

The average salary for a job in Indio increased from $28,224 in 2003 to $35,532 in 2015. The City of Indio is constantly expanding to see the number of jobs and average salaries rise. It is currently in the process of a 2040 general plan to increase the number of developments in Indio. For example, the city opened a 120-room Fairfield Inn and Suites in February 2019 and broke ground on a 93-room Hampton Inn and Suites that is expected to open January 2020. A new movie theater and the continual development of retail stores at the Indio Towne Center, The Showcase at Indio, and The Palms shopping centers is also anticipated to create an abundance of jobs.

Light industry is not new to Indio. Between the 1960s and the early 1980s, the Bank of America-owned Giannini Research Institute, Kaiser Inc. and Cabazon Firearms had contracts with both NASA and the US Armed Forces that produced ammunition, computer parts, moon rover parts for the Apollo landing program, and train engines for the Southern Pacific Railroad. Indio sought more corporate businesses and office professions, including fruit packing and shipping firms. Locally based United States Filter Corporation, Guy Evans Inc., Dimare Fruit Co., West Coast Turf and Japanese-owned Sun World Inc.; and move-in companies such as Borden, Coca-Cola, Ernie Ball, Ernst and Young, Ferguson, Fulton Distributors, Guthy-Renker, Pulte Homes, Sunrise Company, SunScape Tech and Tala Industries choose Indio for the location of transport routes, low economic costs, and growth potential.

Indio is home to Buzz Box Premium Cocktails, Ring Power Corporation, Triangle Distributing Company (formerly Heimark), The Forager Project, and Purus International. Other companies in Indio include Pepsi Cola Distributing, RDO Equipment, Sepulveda Building Materials, Fortun Foods, Arctic Glacier, A.C. Houston Lumber Company, and Commercial Lighting Industry.

Top employers
According to the city's 2020 Comprehensive Annual Financial Report, the top employers in the city are:

Native American gaming

Two Native American owned casinos in and near Indio are the Fantasy Springs Resort Casino, owned by the Cabazon Band of Mission Indians, and the Spotlight 29 Casino, owned by the Twenty-Nine Palms Band of Mission Indians. Spotlight 29 formerly was "Trump 29" when it was partly owned by then-businessman Donald Trump for a brief period of time in the 2000s.

Arts and culture

Annual events

Because of the numerous festivals and special events held annually in Indio, the Chamber of Commerce deemed Indio's official nickname to be "The City of Festivals". Indio is considered the second County seat, the Riverside County Fairgrounds is a facility that hosts various events year round such as music concerts, 4x4 monster truck rallies, rodeos, and other special events.

Two major annual festivals are the Indio International Tamale Festival and the Riverside County Fair and National Date Festival and are held each February at the Riverside County Fairgrounds, located on Highway 111 in the heart of Indio. Since 1947, this festival has celebrated the date fruit crop of the Coachella Valley.

In 1993, Paul Tollett, president of Goldenvoice, booked a Pearl Jam concert at the Empire Polo Club in Indio, and six years later, the Coachella Valley Music and Arts Festival was born. Since 2001, Coachella has been an annual event that has brought notable music acts to the desert, including: AC/DC, Red Hot Chili Peppers, Guns N' Roses, Prince, Paul McCartney, Lady Gaga, Beyoncé, Ariana Grande, Kanye West, Radiohead, Dr. Dre, Snoop Dogg, Pixies, The Cure, The White Stripes, Jay-Z, Tool, Beastie Boys, Jane's Addiction, Roger Waters and several others. Coachella extended the festival to three days in 2007. Organizers eliminated single-day tickets in 2010 and went to three-day passes only. The festival continues to draw large numbers of concertgoers to Indio and the Empire Polo Club, a venue that Rolling Stone said possessed a "lush beauty... that made the desert seem very far away."

In May 2007, Goldenvoice, promoters of Coachella, started Stagecoach, a three-day country music festival held the weekend following the Coachella. Performers have included George Strait, Kenny Chesney, the Eagles, Sugarland, Taylor Swift, Carrie Underwood, Luke Bryan, Keith Urban, and Kid Rock.

In 2013, OC Weeklys Dave Barton described the arts scene in Indio with "seems to consist of Johnny Cash tributes, chalk art, camel and ostrich races, and Neil Simon revivals."

In 2016, Goldenvoice brought together The Rolling Stones, The Who, Paul McCartney, Bob Dylan, Roger Waters, and Neil Young for a 3-day mega concert known as Desert Trip. Desert Trip took place at the same venue as the Coachella Music Festival, over two three-day weekends, on October 7–9 and 14–16, 2016. Despite Desert Trip becoming the highest-grossing music festival in history, Goldenvoice founder Paul Tollett has not announced any plans for a second Desert Trip, stating that it's not necessary for it to "turn into another franchise festival".

Indio is also the site of many other annual arts, culture, and entertainment festivals and events. Among these include:

 The Southwest Arts Festival at the Empire Polo Club
 The Cabazon Indian National Pow wow at Fantasy Springs Resort and Casino
 The Palm Springs Kennel Club's Annual Dog Show and Rhythm at the Empire Polo Club
 The Heritage/Living History Festival at the Coachella Valley History Museum
 The Family Motor Coach Association's Annual Western Region RV Rally at the Riverside County Fairgrounds
 The Sand Storm Lacrosse Festival at the Empire Polo Club
 Arbor Day Celebration
 Indio Tree Lighting Ceremony
 Dia de Los Muertos Celebration at the Coachella Valley History Museum
 Taste of Indio at Jackalope Ranch
 The California BBQ State Championship & Festival

Points of interest

The Coachella Valley History Museum Home, on Miles Avenue, has a two-acre campus, which currently includes the Smiley-Tyler House, built in 1926, the 1909 Schoolhouse, and the Date Museum dedicated to the history and development of the fruit (the only date museum in the world), plus gardens and archives preserving historical artifacts of the Coachella Valley. It also has the historic M.H. Whittier Ranch Tower, which is used for the only light art projection system in the Coachella Valley.

The Indio Performing Arts Center, known as IPAC, is located at the heart of downtown Indio at 45–175 Fargo Street to promote arts and entertainment for the community. IPAC has hosted live concerts, theater productions, dinner theater events and sing-alongs, movie nights, fashion shows, arts and crafts fairs, music video productions, and other special events. IPAC is a 23,000 sq. ft. facility with a main hall, the Expo Hall; three separate theaters that are approximately 2,200 sq. ft. each: Village Theatre, Cabaret Theatre, and the Old Towne Playhouse. Desert TheatreWorks occupies the facility, which has produced more than 50 plays and musicals, 8 children's musicals and more than 20 special events, making them one of the Coachella Valley's leading producers of theatre and educational programming for the performing arts. The College of the Desert also has a film class in the Village Theatre during the school year.

The Coachella Valley Art Center is located at 45140 Towne Street in downtown Indio. It hosts a variety of art exhibits, workshops, and special events throughout the year and includes a main gallery, project spaces, classrooms, a glass studio, performance space, and artist studios. The center has hosted local and international artists, and been a venue for art events and live performances.

From January to March each year, polo season is in full effect at the Eldorado Polo Club and the Empire Polo Club. Tailgating, food vendors, picnics, and great polo games are a common sight at these family-friendly Sunday events.

Golfing is another main attraction that brings people from far and wide to Indio and surrounding cities, with the Coachella Valley housing approximately 28 percent of all California's golf courses. Golf course development in the desert became a huge phenomenon in the 1950s, with a golf course opening approximately every 100 days. During the winter months, country clubs with golf courses attract dozens of vacationers each year. Today, there are more than 13 golf courses located in Indio and 124 golf courses in the entire Coachella Valley. The City of Indio, in particular, owns the only night-lighted golf course in the Coachella Valley – the Lights at Indio Golf Course.

Casinos are also a point of interest in Indio that draw a large crowd. Fantasy Springs Resort Casino is owned by the Cabazon Band of Mission Indians, whose tribal headquarters are also located in Indio. The casino opened in 2004 and includes a hotel, bowling center, golf course, and special events center that acts as a concert venue. The Fantasy Springs special events center has hosted musicians as big as The Beach Boys, John Legend, Snoop Dogg, Stevie Nicks, and Kelly Clarkson.

Old Town Historic Mural Program
In the fall of 1996, the Indio Chamber of Commerce formed a committee to develop a Historic Mural Project to help revitalize the local economy at the time of the statewide economic recession. Several communities have benefited from similar programs, such as Chemainus, Canada; El Paso, Texas; and Eureka, Bishop, Needles, & 29 Palms in California, as well the famous Chicano Park mural to commemorate Hispanic-American life in Barrio Logan, San Diego in the late 1970s.

It began with a suggestion to start a mural project first brought to the city by David Hernandez, a former Indio city council member, after he visited Chemainus. Very little happened with this concept until 1996, when the Riverside County National Date Festival's executive director Bruce Latta and commissioned artist Bill Weber of San Francisco to paint a mural of the Taj Mahal on the Taj Mahal (Garden of Allah) building at the fairgrounds. At the same time, local businessman Bruce Clark, who was instrumental in promoting Historic U.S. Route 99 (Indio Blvd.) to its former status as the Main Street of California. He maintains a website on Historic Route 99. He brought the mural idea forward again after seeing the success of a similar local program in 29 Palms. When Clark presented the idea to the chamber board of directors, the idea was immediately recognized as something that could help the city's economy by encouraging tourism. Indio now has ten murals about the city on the sides of various buildings in Old Town and on a water reservoir tank on Monroe Street.

Politics

The city operates under a City Council-City Manager form of government with five elected members of the City Council served by a City Manager and staff and City Attorney. The five councilmembers are elected by district for four-year terms. Each year the Council selects the Mayor on a rotational basis and determines assignments for the external commissions and committees at its first meeting of December. The City Council is the legislative body for the city, Public Financing Authority and Redevelopment Agency. Its responsibilities include establishing City policies, adopting of ordinances and resolutions as well as the budget, holding public hearings, authorizing expenditures, and the appointment of the City Manager, City Attorney and the member of City commissions and committees.
 Mayor – Waymond Fermon
 Mayor Pro Tem – Oscar Ortiz
 Councilmember – Elaine Holmes
 Councilmember – Lupe Ramos Amith
 Councilmember – Glenn Miller

Education
Indio is served by two public school districts: Desert Sands Unified and on the city's southeastern corner, Coachella Valley Unified. Desert Sands' headquarters is located in La Quinta.

Indio's six elementary and two middle schools are highly rated under the California Distinguished Schools program. Because of Indio's growing population and above-average number of young people with families, the two school districts are expanding, with plans on building more schools, along with remodeling the older ones with new buildings and designs.

Schools in or near Indio:

Desert Sands Unified
 Elementary (grades K–5): Carrillo Ranch, Dr. Reynaldo J. Carreon Jr. Academy, Amelia Earhart (International studies), John Adams (STEM school) near Benjamin Franklin in La Quinta, Richard Oliphant, Herbert Hoover, Andrew Jackson, Lyndon B. Johnson, John F. Kennedy, James Madison, James Monroe (in Bermuda Dunes), Theodore Roosevelt, Martin Van Buren, and Horizon Elementary (independent studies) in La Quinta
 Middle/junior high schools (grades 6–8): Colonel Mitchell Paige Middle School (in La Quinta), La Quinta Middle, Desert Ridge Academy; Thomas Jefferson; Indio Middle School (Charter); John Glenn Middle School of International Studies (California Distinguished School); and Horizon Middle (independent studies) in La Quinta
 High schools (grades 9–12): Indio High; La Quinta High in La Quinta; Shadow Hills; Amistad High, a continuation high school in former site of Woodrow Wilson Middle School; and Horizon High (independent studies) in La Quinta
 Adult school: Courses include: GED Test preparation, ESL Beg/Int/Adv classes, Citizenship classes, a RossettaStone Language lab, and more.
 Special studies: Eisenhower Community Education Center.

Coachella Valley Unified schools
 Elementary (grades K–6): Mountain Vista Elementary
 Middle/junior high schools (grades 7–8): Cahuilla Desert Academy
 High schools (grades 9–12): Coachella Valley High and Desert Mirage High School, both in Thermal

Private schools

Grace Academy (K–8), Indio Christian Center (1–12), River Springs Charter School (K–12), Our Lady of Perpetual Help (PK–8), Trinity Lutheran Child Development Center (PK, K) and Christian School of the Desert (PK–12), located in nearby Bermuda Dunes

Higher education

College of the Desert, commonly referred to by its initials (C.O.D), is the Coachella Valley's community college. C.O.D opened a campus facility in 2002 in the Riverside County Employment Developmental Center located on Monroe Street. And their Indio campus on Oasis street.  They expanded their classes to an "East Valley" educational center in Mecca.

Riverside County has a Regional Occupational Program facility in Indio that provides vocational educational courses in the Coachella Valley's job market.

The California Desert Trial Academy College of Law was approved by the California State Bar as an unaccredited fixed facility law school in Indio and is currently holding classes in the County Law Library in Indio. Meanwhile, plans are moving forward on the school constructing its own campus buildings in downtown Indio.

Media
The Indio Date Palm was an early paper established in 1912 by John Winfield (J. Win) Wilson.

Print news in Indio is most notably provided by The Desert Sun, a daily newspaper part of the USA Today Network with a circulation of 14,685 in Indio in 2017. Providing news coverage of the Coachella Valley and distributing to eight cities, The Desert Sun had the largest newspaper circulation in the desert in 2017.

The Coachella Valley also receives news coverage from the Press-Enterprise, a Riverside-based daily newspaper, and Desert Star Weekly, a Riverside County adjudicated newspaper. There are many other independently or Self Published daily newspapers and weeklies covering Indio, such as the Coachella Valley Independent and Tidbits of the Coachella Valley.

Newspapers aimed at a Latino readership are also essential in Indio, due to the high number of Spanish-speaking Hispanics/Latinos in the area. El Informador del Valle is printed in Spanish then distributed to homes and a range of meat markets, gas stations, Hispanic restaurants, and more locally owned businesses throughout Indio. La Prensa Hispana is another such newspaper that is aimed toward Indio's Latino community, but uniquely merges English and Spanish together to provide a bilingual newspaper. The newspaper has received recognition from the Hispanic Chamber of commerce-Coachella Valley for its value and impact on the community.

There are also several online news sources that cover Indio, such as the Coachella Valley Weekly, Cactus Hugs, Coachella Magazine, KESQ, and Los Angeles Times. Entertainment and lifestyle magazines and publications include the Desert Entertainer, Coachella Magazine, and Desert Magazine, among others.

Indio has ten local television stations serving the Coachella Valley and six Spanish-language networks (local or regional affiliates like KUNA-LD and KVER-CD), some of which are over-air signals from Mexico. Eight Los Angeles television stations are available on cable and satellite service.

Four out of 20 Palm Springs area's radio stations are licensed to Indio: KESQ 1400 AM (in Spanish) owned by KESQ-TV/KDFX-CD, KKUU 92.7 FM (Urban/Hip-hop/R&B) owned by Morris Communications, KHCV 104.3, and classic rock KRHQ 102.3 FM owned by RM Broadcasting. However, none of the stations have their offices or studios in Indio. KHCV and KESQ are located in Palm Desert; both KKUU and KRHQ are located in Palm Springs.

Public safety
Indio has its own police department. In 2016, the Indio Police Department was one among 15 law enforcement agencies chosen to participate in President Barack Obama's 21st Century Policing Task Force. Recognized for its achievements in community engagement, the Indio Police Department was charged with implementing the Task Force's recommendations for policing in a year-long study. During Coachella Fest, Indio Police is able to handle a large number of 911 and non-emergency calls due to its six-position public safety answering point (PSAP).

In addition to the Indio Police Department, the city also contracts with the Riverside County Sheriff's Department for police services.

The city of Indio contracts for fire and paramedic services with the Riverside County Fire Department through a cooperative agreement with CAL FIRE. Indio has 4 fire stations used to reduce response times, and a full-time staff of 56 people.

The City of Indio also has a Fire Services Prevention Office, and, through the Riverside County, participates in the Volunteer Reserve Firefighter Program.

One of the eleven U.S. Customs and Border Protection stations is located in Indio. Created in 1936, the station was originally an auxiliary for the El Centro Sector station. Now, the border patrol agents stationed in Indio are tasked with patrolling the northern portion of Imperial County.

Indio is also the site of a California Highway Patrol Border Division office. The division patrols Interstate 10, State Routes 62, 86, and 177, which encompasses cities such as Desert Hot Springs, Palm Springs, Cathedral City, Rancho Mirage, Palm Desert, La Quinta, Indio, and Coachella.

Infrastructure

Transportation
Bermuda Dunes Airport (FAA designator: UDD) is on the north-western border of Indio, along I-10 just west of Jefferson Street. It has a  runway and serves small private planes, air carriers and commuter jets. The Jacqueline Cochran Regional Airport in Thermal just a few minutes from Indio, is named for the famous 1920s pilot and Indio resident and used for cargo planes to ship agricultural products, also on the four-lane California State Route 86 expressway or the "NAFTA highway" (in reference to the North American Free Trade Agreement) for international traffic.

Greyhound and Amtrak Thruway Motorcoach intercity passenger buses stop at Indio station with regular services to stops in Southern California, Arizona, and the Mexican border. The city is served by the local bus line SunLine Transit Agency ("SunBus"), which services much of the Coachella Valley. The Amtrak rail station is expected to be reactivated in April 2021 for that year's Coachella Valley Music Festival.  the city and the Riverside County Transportation Commission are planning a passenger rail service that will run to Los Angeles from Indio.

Interstate 10 is the primary highway in the city, running roughly on the north side. Highway 111 runs through the city which connects the northern end with I-10 in Whitewater, CA to the southern end in Calexico, California.

Health care
The city has a major hospital providing general acute care, known as the John F. Kennedy Memorial Hospital. JFK Memorial Hospital provides a range of services, from 24/7 emergency care to surgical services. One of three hospitals in the Coachella Valley, JFK hospital expanded and opened a new maternity center as part of a 2002 hospital expansion plan for more surgical rooms, intensive care units and a new concrete emergency heliport. The Indio (renamed John F. Kennedy) hospital opened in a new location in 1983 on land donated by hospital co-founder Dr. Reynaldo J. Carreon.

In 2017, JFK Memorial Hospital, Desert Regional Medical Center, and Hi-Desert Medical Center, along with several affiliated outpatient clinics and centers, came together to form the Desert Care Network. According to Desert Care Network CEO Michelle Finney, the main purpose of the Desert Care Network is to "help improve care coordination between our hospitals and our affiliated entities for the more than 125,000 patients we treat every year."

Indio and the rest of the Coachella Valley recognize the need for free or affordable health care services for its residents. Coachella Valley Volunteers in Medicine, a branch of Volunteers in Medicine, is the Coachella Valley's only no-cost clinic providing chronic, acute, preventive, and mental health care to adult residents. Located in Indio, the clinic had a total of 3,154 visits in 2018.

In addition, California Care Force, a non-profit organization that sets up temporary no-cost clinics across California, provides free medical, dental, and vision services for residents at the Riverside County Fairgrounds in Indio each year. In its seventh annual free clinic in 2019, California Care Force served 1,818 Coachella Valley uninsured and underinsured residents.

In 2018, Loma Linda University Children's Health – Indio opened its doors to serve approximately 150 children per week on a range of pediatric services such as general pediatric care, neurological care, and behavioral health counseling. The clinic's large scope of health care services and weekly number of patients is largely due to its  size – making it the largest pediatric center in the Coachella Valley.

Parks and recreation
The city of Indio operates a variety of public parks, including a municipal golf course, a community recreation center, a senior center one block from the Indio teen center located across from Indio High school, and the Desert Park Wildlife Refuge north of 40th and 42nd Avenues.

 Burr Park – Located at 42811 Burr Street
 Cahuilla Park – formerly called Indio Terrace Park. Located at 83787 Hopi Avenue 
 Davis Field – baseball/softball fields. Located at 83100 Date Street
 Dominguez Park – named after Al Dominguez, the city's first Mexican-American councilman in the 1950s/1960s. Located at 81967 Crown Way 
 Doug York Plaza – a gazebo and benches. Located at 82985 Indio Boulevard 
 Dr.Carreon Park – park-playground with water tower arts mural of local history. Located at 82200 Dr. Carreon Boulevard 
 George S. Patton Park – park-playground with basketball and tennis courts. Located at 83700 Avenue 43
 Hjorth Park – Located at 81253 Avenue 48
 Indio Community Center – includes a gymnasium and the Indio Community Park, operated by the Desert Recreation District. Located at 45871 Clinton St
 Miles Avenue Park – Located near the Coachella Valley History Museum at 82540 Miles Avenue
 Mulligan Dog Park – Located at 45355 Van Buren Street
 North Jackson Park – play-playground with basketball courts, tennis courts, softball fields. Located at 43200 Towne Street 
 Shields Park – Located at 80500 Avenue 46
 South Jackson Park – near a Pawley Pool facility, a soccer field, a little league baseball stadium (Davis Sports Complex) and a YMCA/Boys & Girls club. Located at 46480 Jackson Street 
 South Jackson Soccer Park – Located at 83318 Date Street 
 Station 87 Dog Park – Located at 42900 1/2 Golf Center Parkway 
 The Lights at Indio Golf Course – Located at 83040 Avenue 42
 Yucca Park – Located at 43605 Yucca Street

Notable people

Sister cities

Indio had city-to-city economic exchange programs with San Luis Rio Colorado, Sonora, Mexico, in the Sister Cities International (SCI) program. There are similar inter-city exchange agreements with Lynwood, California; Farmington, Minnesota; and American Fork, Utah, in the US, and officials from the Vancouver 2010 Winter Olympic Games visited the 2010 National Date Festival to promote the Vancouver, British Columbia, Canada, area.

References

External links

 
 Indio Chamber of Commerce website
 The Desert Sun, the Coachella Valley's newspaper
 

 
1930 establishments in California
Cities in Riverside County, California
Coachella Valley
Incorporated cities and towns in California
Populated places established in 1930
Populated places in the Colorado Desert